Rhabdophis tigrinus, also known commonly as the tiger keelback, kkotbaem, or yamakagashi, is a species of venomous snake in the subfamily Natricinae of the family Colubridae. The species is native to East Asia and Southeast Asia. Many sources, though not ITIS, recognize one subspecies, Rhabdophis tigrinus formosanus of Taiwan.

Description
The dorsal color pattern of R. tigrinus is olive-drab green, with black and bright orange crossbars or spots from the neck down the first third of the body. The belly is whitish. The average total length (including tail) is usually .

Geographic range
R. tigrinus is found in eastern Russia (Primorskiy and Khabarovsk), North and South Korea, China (widespread, except in the western third and the extreme south; Zhejiang, Fujian, Jiangxi, Hubei, Guizhou, Sichuan, Gansu, Shaanxi and Inner Mongolia), on the island of Taiwan, in  Vietnam and in Japan (Yakushima, Tanegashima, Kyūshū, Shikoku, Honshu, Osaka and in the Ryukyu Islands). The type locality given is "Japan".

Diet
The diet of R. tigrinus consists mainly of small vertebrates, especially frogs and  toads. It forages using both chemical (smell/tongue) and visual cues to find its prey.

Defensive behavior
Rhabdophis tigrinus has two rows of glands in its neck that provide protection from predators by releasing steroidal toxins that are sequestered from ingested poisonous toads, referred to as kleptotoxisism. When this species is challenged at cooler temperatures it tends to demonstrate passive anti-predator responses such as flattening the neck and body and lying still, while at higher temperatures it more frequently flees instead. This snake thus appears to rely more heavily on the deterrence provided by these glands at low ambient temperatures. Although venomous, few deaths have been recorded due to its tendency to display one of these other behaviors as opposed to striking. This hesitancy to strike at a predator in turn may be because its fangs are located in the back of the mouth, making a successful strike on a large object difficult.

References

Further reading
Boie H (1826). "Merkmale einiger japanischen Lurche". Isis von Oken 19: 202–216. (Tropidonotus tigrinus, new species, pp. 205–207). (in German and Latin).
Boulenger GA (1893). Catalogue of the Snakes in the British Museum (Natural History). Volume I. Containing the Families ... Colubridæ Aglyphæ, part. London: Trustees of the British Museum (Natural History). (Taylor and Francis, printers). xiii + 448 pp. + Plates I–XXVIII. (Tropidonotus tigrinus, pp. 249–250).
Stejneger L (1907). Herpetology of Japan and Adjacent Territory. United States National Museum Bulletin 58. Washington, District of Columbia: Smithsonian Institution. xx + 577 pp. (Natrix tigrina, new combination, pp. 272–280, Figures 242–242 + Plate XIX, figures 1–2).

External links
Yamakagashi at the Encyclopedia of Japanese Reptiles. Accessed 21 September 2008.

Rhabdophis
Reptiles of China
Reptiles of Japan
Reptiles of Taiwan
Reptiles of Vietnam
Venomous snakes
Reptiles described in 1826
Taxa named by Heinrich Boie
Reptiles of Russia
Snakes of China
Snakes of Vietnam
Snakes of Asia